Athenea del Castillo Beivide (born 24 October 2000) is a Spanish professional footballer who plays as a forward for Liga F club Real Madrid CF and the Spain women's national team.

Club career

Early career 
Athenea started playing at Reocín in Cantabria at the age of 11, later moving to Ave Fénix Racing where she remained until the end of the 2018–19 Segunda División season, her time there encompassing a 2017 merger whereby the team became part of Racing Santander.

Deportivo
In August 2019, it was announced that Athenea would be joining the newly promoted Primera División club, Deportivo Abanca, without the permission of her old club who tried to retain her registration, while the Galicians maintained their offer of a professional contract took precedence. Finally, in September, Racing Féminas formally allowed her transfer.

On 8 September 2019, Athenea made her Primera División debut for Deportivo against RCD Espanyol and scored her first goal on 19 January 2020.

Real Madrid
On 26 July 2021, following Deportivo's relegation, it was announced that she would be joining Real Madrid.

International career 
Athenea was called into the Spain U19 squad for the 2018 UEFA Women's Under-19 Championship in Switzerland, where the team won the title; she was also part of the squad that finished runners-up in the same competition a year later. She made her senior international debut in October 2020, becoming the first serving Deportivo player to gain a full cap.

Career statistics

Club

International goals

Honours 
International
UEFA Women's Under-19 Championship: 2018

References

External links

 Athenea, BDFutbol

2000 births
Living people
Footballers from Cantabria
Women's association football forwards
Women's association football wingers
Spanish women's footballers
Primera División (women) players
Deportivo de La Coruña (women) players
Real Madrid Femenino players
People from Trasmiera
Spain women's international footballers
CDE Racing Féminas players
SD Reocín (women) players
UEFA Women's Euro 2022 players
Spain women's youth international footballers